Pedro Silva y Tenorio, O.P. (died 1479) was a Roman Catholic prelate who served as Bishop of Badajoz (1461-1479), Bishop of Ourense (1447-1461), and Bishop of Lugo (1445-1447).

Biography
Pedro Silva y Tenorio was ordained a priest in the Order of Preachers. In 1445, he was appointed by Pope Eugene IV as Bishop of Lugo. In 1447, he was appointed by Pope Nicholas V as Bishop of Ourense. On 19 October 1461, he was appointed by Pope Pius II as Bishop of Badajoz. He served as Bishop of Badajoz until his death on 20 January 1479.

References

External links and additional sources
 (for Chronology of Bishops) 
 (for Chronology of Bishops) 
 (for Chronology of Bishops) 
 (for Chronology of Bishops) 

1479 deaths
15th-century Roman Catholic bishops in Castile
Bishops appointed by Pope Eugene IV
Bishops appointed by Pope Nicholas V
Bishops appointed by Pope Pius II
Dominican bishops